Shaike Ophir (November 4, 1928 – August 17, 1987) was an Israeli film and theater actor, comedian, playwright, screenwriter, director, and the country's first mime.

Early life
Yeshayahu (Shaike) Goldstein-Ophir was born in Jerusalem. His family were Masortiim, and his Ashkenazi Jewish ancestry in the city goes back to the mid-19th century.

He studied acting as an adolescent, but left school in the 1940s to enlist in the Palmach. During the 1948 Arab-Israeli War he escorted convoys to the besieged city of Jerusalem, and took part in naval battles.

Career
Thanks to his comic skills he was accepted to the Chezbatron, an army entertainment troupe. 
In the 1950s, he made a name for himself as a multi-talented performer. He had even recorded a few hit songs during this period.

During the late 1950s and early 1960s Ophir occasionally guest-starred in American TV shows such as Shirley Temple's Storybook and Alfred Hitchcock Presents (in the episode "The Waxwork," where he was billed as Shai K. Ophir). Ophir acted in 28 films, wrote, directed and starred in several variety shows and was an accomplished mime, appearing alongside Marcel Marceau. He reached the peak of his international fame in the title role of Ha-Shoter Azoulay (literally, Policeman Azoulay, translated as The Policeman), a film-vehicle by Ephraim Kishon which won a Golden Globe for Best Foreign-Language Film (1972) and was nominated for a Best Foreign Language Academy Award the same year. He also starred in other Ephraim Kishon films, including Ervinka, Blaumilch Canal and The Fox in the Chicken Coop, and the 1973 Moshé Mizrahi film Daughters, Daughters. In 1977 he starred opposite Melanie Griffith in The Garden.

In 1985, Ophir starred in a stage adaptation of Janusz Korczak's children's novel King Matt the First, where he played seven different roles. The children's play was very successful and ran for three years. Over this period Ophir was diagnosed with lung cancer, to which he succumbed in 1987. Ophir was a theatrical director for HaGashash HaHiver. He also directed the Israeli movie Hamesh Ma'ot Elef Shahor, and wrote the screenplay for 4 Israeli movies. He wrote and performed many sketches and comedy routines, many of which are still popular in Israel today. He also did a series of Arabic-instruction TV programs that ran through the 1980s.

He also appeared in the Chuck Norris film, The Delta Force.

Personal life
Ophir was married twice and had four children, two from each spouse. His daughter, Karin Ophir, is also an actress. 
Shaike Ophir, a heavy smoker, died from lung cancer in 1987.

Filmography

1956: B'Ein Moledet
1956: Ma'aseh B'Monit .... Soldier 
1963: El Dorado .... Shneider
1964: Shemona B'Ekevot Ahat
1964: Hor B'Levana
1964: Dalia Vehamalahim
1966: Moishe Ventilator
1967: Ervinka .... The Sergeant
1968: Ha-Shehuna Shelanu
1969: Blaumilch Canal .... Police Officer
1971: The Policeman .... Constable Sgt. Abraham Azulai
1972: Shod Hatelephonim Hagadol
1973: Daughters, Daughters .... Sabbatai Alfandari
1973: The House on Chelouche Street .... Haim
1975: Yi'ihiyeh Tov Salmonico
1975: Diamonds .... Moshe
1977: Hamesh Ma'ot Elef Shahor
1977: The Garden .... Avram
1977: Gonev Miganav Patoor
1977: Operation Thunderbolt .... Gadi Arnon
1978: Ha-Shu'al B'Lool Hatarnagalot .... Amitz Dolniker
1979: The Magician of Lublin .... Schmul
1979: Ta'ut Bamispar .... Superintendent Moshe Cohen
1985: King Solomon's Mines .... Kassam
1986: The Delta Force .... Father Nicholas
1986: America 3000 .... Lelz 
1987: Sleeping Beauty .... Master Elf (final film role)

Awards and commemoration
The Israeli Film Academy award is named the "Ophir Award" in his honor.

References

External links
 
 Shaike Ophir, filmography

1928 births
1987 deaths
Israeli male comedians
Israeli male film actors
Jewish Israeli male actors
Israeli male stage actors
Israeli male television actors
Israeli entertainers
Ashkenazi Jews in Mandatory Palestine
Male actors from Jerusalem
Palmach members
20th-century Israeli male actors
20th-century Israeli comedians
Deaths from lung cancer in Israel
Burials at Nahalat Yitzhak Cemetery